Dame Barbara Estelle Shenfield ( Farrow, later Mrs Lewis; 9 March 1919 – 17 June 2004) was a British academic and Liberal Party politician. She was Chair of the Women's Royal Voluntary Service. She was appointed Dame Commander of the Most Excellent Order of the British Empire in 1986.

Background
Born in Smethwick, Staffordshire to George and Jane Farrow, of Bearwood, she attended Langley High School, Worcester and the University of Birmingham, where she received Honors in Social and Political Science, graduating in three years.

In May 1941 she married Flt-Lt. Gwilym Ivor Lewis who was killed in action in August 1941. Their son, Peter, was born in 1942.

Professional career

During the war she worked in the Women's Land Army. After the war she worked as a University Lecturer in social studies at her alma mater, the University of Birmingham. In 1959, after a three-year break, she worked as a Lecturer at the Department of Economics and Social Studies, Bedford College, London University, until 1965.

She was a member of the Academic Council at the newly established University Buckingham from 1972 to 1973. She was Visiting Professor in the United States: at Michigan State University in 1960 and Temple University (Philadelphia) in 1974, Distinguished Visiting Professor at Rockford College (Illinois) from 1969 to 1971 and again in 1974. She was Consultant at the US Department of Labor in 1964.

She was Director of PEP Study of Company Boards' Social Responsibilities from 1965 to 1968. She was a Member of the UK Government Committee on Local Taxation from 1965 to 1966, the UK Government Committee on Abuse of Welfare Services from 1971 to 1973 and the Government Review Team on Social Security from 1984 to 1985.

She was Chairman of the National Executive of the National Old People's Welfare Council (later Age Concern) from 1971 to 1973. She was Chairman of the Women's Royal Voluntary Service from 1981 to 1988, in recognition of which she was created Dame Commander of the Order of the British Empire (DBE) in 1986. 

She was Chair of the Friends of the Imperial War Museum from 1991 to 2002. She was a member of the Pornography and Violence Res. Trust from 1996 to 2002. She was a Trustee of the Social Affairs Unit from 1990 to 2003.

Political career
She was Liberal candidate for the Handsworth division of Birmingham at the 1950 General Election. She had an uphill battle to win the seat as it had been Conservative for decades;

She continued her activity in the party and was elected a member of the Liberal Party national executive. She was also involved in party policy development being a joint author of the Liberal report The Aged and the Nation. She did not contest the 1950 General Election. She was Liberal candidate for the Walsall division of Staffordshire at the 1951 General Election; 

She did not stand for parliament again.

Publications
She was a notable writer on social and political affairs. Among her publications were: 
1957: Social Policies for Old Age: A Review of Social Provision for Old Age in Great Britain
1971: The Social Responsibilities of Company Boards 
1971: Company Boards: Their Responsibilities to Shareholders, Employees, and the Community
1972: The Organisation of a Voluntary Service: A Study of Domiciliary Visiting of the Elderly by Volunteers 
1975: Myths of Social Policy (a Series of Four Lectures Delivered at Rockford College, Rockford, Illinois)

Arthur Shenfield
In 1951, ten years after the death of her first husband, she married Birmingham lecturer Arthur Shenfield (died 1990). A decade her senior, he was also active in the Liberal Party. In 1939 he was prospective parliamentary candidate for Willesden East. 
Due to the outbreak of war, the election did not take place. By 1945 he had switched to stand as Liberal candidate for Birmingham Edgbaston. Like her, he finished third;

The Shenfields had one son, Martin. By 1955, Arthur Shenfield had cut his ties with the Liberal Party to become economic director at the Federation of British Industries. Shenfield was a notable writer on economic and political affairs and had published the following works;
1962: British Made Abroad
1963: The Two Faces of the Common Market
1968: The Political Economy of Tax Avoidance (a lecture)
1970: The Ideological War Against Western Society
1971: The Roots of American Discontent
1972: Business and Consumerism
1977: The Rise of Trade Union Power in Britain
1977: From Campus to Capitol: The Cost of Intellectual Bankruptcy
1978: The Uses and Abuses of Eminent Domain
1980: The Failure of Socialism: Learning from the Swedes and English
1981: Myth and Reality in Economic Systems
1983: Myth and reality in anti-trust
1983: Icarus: Or the Fate of Democratic Socialism
1986: What Right to Strike?
1998: Limited Government, Individual Liberty and the Rule of Law

References

1909 births
2004 deaths
Academics of the University of Birmingham
British non-fiction writers
Burials at Brompton Cemetery
Dames Commander of the Order of the British Empire
Liberal Party (UK) parliamentary candidates
People from Smethwick
Alumni of the University of Birmingham
Place of death missing
20th-century non-fiction writers
Academics of Bedford College, London